Bang Pla is a tambon (subdistrict) of Bang Phli District, in Samut Prakan Province, Thailand. In 2018, it had a total population of 32,819 people.

References

Tambon of Samut Prakan Province